Heartz is a surname. Notable people with the surname include:

Daniel Heartz (1928–2019), American musicologist 
Frank Richard Heartz (1871–1955), Canadian politician

See also
Heart (surname)
Hertz (surname)
Herz (surname)
Hurtz (surname)